Harry Conrad Long (13 February 1910 – 29 July 2003) was an Australian rules footballer who played for Melbourne in the Victorian Football League (VFL).

Launceston's Harry Long made his VFL debut in 1929 and was with Melbourne for most of the 1930s, including a stint as vice-captain. He was a losing preliminary finalist in his last two seasons and retired just before the club claimed their three successive premierships under Checker Hughes. A half back, he also played at Lefroy in Tasmania and in 2005 was inducted into the Tasmanian Football Hall of Fame.

References

Holmesby, Russell and Main, Jim (2007). The Encyclopedia of AFL Footballers. 7th ed. Melbourne: Bas Publishing.

External links

1910 births
2003 deaths
Melbourne Football Club players
Launceston Football Club players
Lefroy Football Club players
Australian rules footballers from Tasmania
Tasmanian Football Hall of Fame inductees